Rubber banding may refer to:
 in video games, the rubber band effect in dynamic game difficulty balancing, where AI characters falling behind may get a boost by the game while those ahead may be hindered.
 in online video gaming, an undesirable effect of latency in which a moving object appears to leap from one place to another without passing through the intervening space; also called "warping" or "teleporting"
 in 2D computer graphics, anchoring a line segment at one end and moving the other end
 in console gaming, this can refer to the act of holding a trigger down with a rubber band in order to perform some kind of auto-attack or cheat.